Khondab (also Romanized as Khondāb; also known as Khūnāb, Qandāq, and Qondāq) is a village in Seyyed Jamal ol Din Rural District, in the Central District of Asadabad County, Hamadan Province, Iran. At the 2006 census, its population was 111, in 25 families.

References 

Populated places in Asadabad County